The F Line was a light rail line, part of the rail system operated by the Regional Transportation District in the Denver-Aurora Metropolitan Area in Colorado.

Route 
The F Line's northern terminus is at 18th Street in downtown Denver. It shares track with the D Line from 18th Street to I-25 & Broadway, then runs along the Southeast Corridor to Lone Tree.

On September 20, 2020, Regional Transportation District suspended the F Line due to the ongoing coronavirus pandemic. The line never returned to service and was officially eliminated ahead of the January 2023 service change.

Stations

FasTracks 

The extension cost $223 million to construct and was opened on May 17, 2019.

References

External links 

RTD light rail
Transportation in Arapahoe County, Colorado
Transportation in Douglas County, Colorado
750 V DC railway electrification
Railway services introduced in 2006
Railway services discontinued in 2020